Microbembex is a genus of sand wasps in the family Crabronidae. There are more than 30 described species in Microbembex.

Species
These 36 species belong to the genus Microbembex:

 Microbembex albivena R. Bohart, 1993
 Microbembex anilis (Handlirsch, 1893)
 Microbembex argentifrons (Cresson, 1865)
 Microbembex argentina Brèthes, 1913
 Microbembex argyropleura R. Bohart, 1970
 Microbembex aurata J. Parker, 1917
 Microbembex australis R. Bohart, 1989
 Microbembex bidens J. Parker, 1929
 Microbembex californica R. Bohart, 1970
 Microbembex catamarcae Willink, 1989
 Microbembex ciliata (Fabricius, 1804)
 Microbembex coxalis R. Bohart, 1993
 Microbembex cubana R. Bohart, 1976
 Microbembex difformis (Handlirsch, 1893)
 Microbembex elegans Griswold, 1996
 Microbembex equalis J. Parker, 1929
 Microbembex evansi R. Bohart, 1993
 Microbembex gratiosa (F. Smith, 1856)
 Microbembex hirsuta J. Parker, 1917
 Microbembex luteipes R. Bohart, 1993
 Microbembex mendozae R. Bohart, 1989
 Microbembex mondonta
 Microbembex monodonta (Say, 1824) (sand bee)
 Microbembex monstrosa Willink, 1989
 Microbembex mosdonta
 Microbembex nasuta J. Parker, 1929
 Microbembex nigrifrons (Provancher, 1888)
 Microbembex patagonica (Brèthes, 1913)
 Microbembex platytarsis R. Bohart, 1989
 Microbembex pygidialis (Handlirsch, 1893)
 Microbembex rufiventris R. Bohart, 1970
 Microbembex sternalis R. Bohart, 1993
 Microbembex subgratiosa (Strand, 1910)
 Microbembex sulphurea (Spinola, 1851)
 Microbembex tricosa J. Parker, 1929
 Microbembex uruguayensis (Holmberg, 1884)

References

External links

 

Crabronidae
Articles created by Qbugbot
Hymenoptera genera